Timothy Tyler Childers  (born June 21, 1991) is an American singer and songwriter. His music is a mix of neotraditional country, bluegrass, and folk. He released his breakthrough album Purgatory in August 2017. Childers has released five studio albums and a number of EPs and singles.

Early life
Tyler Childers was born and raised in Lawrence County, Kentucky. His father worked in the coal industry and his mother is a nurse. He learned to sing in church where he sang in the church choir. He started to play guitar and write songs when he was around 13. He attended Paintsville High School in nearby Paintsville, in Johnson County, Kentucky, from which he graduated in 2009. Fellow country musicians Chris Stapleton (Staffordsville), Loretta Lynn, and Crystal Gayle also hail from Johnson County.

Childers studied for a semester at Western Kentucky University, and enrolled at Bluegrass Community and Technical College for a few semesters.  He dropped out of college and did odd jobs for some time while pursuing a music career.

Career
Childers began performing in Lexington, Kentucky and Huntington, West Virginia. In 2011, when he was 19, Childers released his first album, Bottles And Bibles. He has also released two EPs recorded in 2013 at Red Barn Radio, a radio show from Lexington. The two EPs were later released as one under the name Live on Red Barn Radio I & II after the success of his album Purgatory, and reached No. 5 on Heatseekers Albums.  He performed with a backing band called The Food Stamps.

He had his first success with Purgatory, a breakthrough album released on August 4, 2017. The album was produced by Sturgill Simpson and David Ferguson and recorded at The Butcher Shoppe in Nashville. Simpson also played guitar and sang backing vocals on the album, with Miles Miller on drums, Stuart Duncan on fiddle and Russ Paul on other instruments. It debuted at No. 1 on Billboards Heatseekers Albums chart, No. 17 on the Country albums chart and No. 4 on the Americana/Folk albums chart. In September 2018, Childers won Emerging Artist of the Year at the 2018 Americana Music Honors & Awards, where he gave an acceptance speech noted for its criticism of the Americana genre label, saying that "as a man who identifies as a country music singer, I feel Americana ain't no part of nothing and is a distraction from the issues that we're facing on a bigger level as country music singers. It kind of feels like purgatory."

Country Squire, a second album under the Hickman Holler label, and Childers' third overall, was released on August 2, 2019, after being announced in May 2019. This album was again produced by Simpson and Ferguson. The video of the lead single from the album House Fire was also released on May 16, 2019. "All Your'n," the second single from the album, was nominated for Best Country Solo Performance at the 62nd Annual Grammy Awards.

On September 18, 2020, Childers released Long Violent History; a surprise album consisting mainly of traditional fiddle tracks. The album closes with the title track, "Long Violent History", an original song that discusses racism, civil unrest and police brutality. He released a video message to accompany the song, in which he discussed his intention for the album in general and the title track in particular, calling for empathy above all else. The video also reveals that 100% of the profits from the album will be used to support underserved communities in the Appalachian region, through Childers' own Hickman Holler Appalachian Relief Fund.

On September 30, 2022, Childers released a triple album Can I Take My Hounds to Heaven?. The album is divided into three parts: Hallelujah, Jubilee, and Joyful Noise, and eight songs are presented in three different ways (Jubilee versions for example have additional instruments added to the Hallelujah version). The album charted at No. 8, which is Childers' first top 10 album on Billboard 200, based on 27,000 units earned in the first week.

Musical style
Childers' music is influenced by his home state of Kentucky and its connection to country music and bluegrass. He often writes about coal mining, which was his father's occupation, and its effects. Rebecca Bengal, writing for The Guardian, described Childers' songs as a "counternarrative to the outsiders who seek to perpetuate stereotypes of backwardness and poverty." Childers emphasizes lyrical content in songs, comparing the songwriting process to telling short stories.

In January 2020, Childers maintained his position on Americana during an interview with World Cafe:

Personal life
In 2015, Childers married fellow performer, Senora May, who is also a Kentucky native. In April 2022, they announced that they are expecting their first child.

The Food Stamps band members

Current members
 Craig Burletic – bass guitar
 Chase Lewis – keyboards
 Rodney Elkins – drums
 James Barker – pedal steel guitar
 "The Professor" Jesse Wells – other guitars, fiddle
 CJ Cain – guitar

Discography

Studio albums

EPs

Singles

Other charted and certified songs

Music videos

Awards and nominations

References

American country singer-songwriters
American male singer-songwriters
Country musicians from Kentucky
People from Lawrence County, Kentucky
Living people
1991 births
21st-century American singers
21st-century American male singers
Thirty Tigers artists